Paisius II Kioumourtzoglou, (? – 11 December 1756) was Ecumenical Patriarch of Constantinople for four times in the 18th century.

Life
Paisius was born in Caesarea and his family name was Kioumourtzoglou (a Turkish name, as common among the mainly Karamanli Cappadocian Greeks). He probably moved early to Istanbul and became Metropolitan of Nicomedia before 1716, probably in 1712.

The first time that Paisius was elected as Patriarch of Constantinople was 20 November 1726, the day when Callinicus III was found dead by heart attack before his enthronement: Paisius was immediately chosen by the faction that previously elected Callinicus to preclude a return to the throne of Jeremias III. The first years of his reign were marked by clashes with the faction gathered around the community of Caesarea, whose main representatives were Jeremias III and later Neophytus VI, despite the fact that Paisius himself was born in this town. In 1731 this faction tried to depose him and to restore Jeremias, but failed. A second attempt in September 1732 was successful, when Jeremias III overthrew him. When later Jeremias had to retire due to health problems, a Patriarch from Nicomedia (Serapheim I) followed and later again one from Caesarea (Neophytus VI) who reigned six years.

The reign of Neophytus VI was ended by a decision of the Grand Vizier, who allowed Paisius to be reinstalled for his second term in August 1740. However three years later, in May 1743, Paisius was deposed by the Ottoman authorities for financial issues and Neophytus VI was restored.

The third reign of Paisius began in March 1744, when he overthrew Neophytus. Shortly after however a new opponent arose: the Metropolitan of Nicomedia and future Patriarch Cyril V Karakallos, who voiced the complaints against him and was able to depose him on 28 September 1748. The complaints were due mainly to Paisius' financial management of the millet, i.e. the Christian civil community ruled by the Patriarch: to reduce the high levels of debts, Paisius increased the taxation particularly of the laity, and this caused discontent with him.

Paisius II's fourth term was an interlude in the reign of Cyril V, and began in last days of May 1751 when Cyril was actually deposed by the Metropolitans both because of his regulations on taxes and because of his strong position in favor of the necessity of re-baptism of Armenian and Latin converts. Cyril however was supported by a large portion of the populace and by the demagogic monk Auxentios, who instigated riots which culminated in a violent assault on the Patriarchate and the seizure of Paisius himself. Paisius was subsequently deposed and Cyril V was reinstated on 7 September 1752 after a gift to the Ottoman authorities of 45,000 piastres.

After his fourth and final deposition, Paisius retired in the monastery of Kamariotissa on island of Halki, where he died on 11 December 1756.

Notes

Sources
 

17th-century births
1756 deaths
18th-century Ecumenical Patriarchs of Constantinople
Cappadocian Greeks
18th-century Greek people
Paisius II of Constantinople